Copromorpha kijimuna is a moth in the Copromorphidae family. It is found in Japan (Ryukyu Islands).

References

Natural History Museum Lepidoptera generic names catalog

Copromorphidae
Moths described in 2004